Pan American World Airways Flight 202 was a Boeing 377 Stratocruiser aircraft that crashed in the Amazon Basin about  southwest of Carolina, Brazil on April 29, 1952. The accident happened en route from Rio de Janeiro, Brazil, to Port of Spain, Trinidad and Tobago, during the third leg of a four-leg journey. All 50 people on board were killed in the deadliest-ever accident involving the Boeing 377.

The investigation took place under exceptionally unfavorable conditions, and the exact cause of the crash was not established. However, it was theorized based on an examination of the wreckage that an engine had separated in flight after propeller blade failure.

Aircraft
The Boeing 377 Stratocruiser registration N1039V, christened Clipper Good Hope, made its first flight on September 28, 1949. At the time of the accident, it had accumulated a total of 6944 airframe hours in flight. It was equipped with four 28-cylinder Pratt & Whitney R-4360 Wasp Major radial piston engines, each with a Hamilton Standard Model 24260 four-blade propeller. The propeller blades were constructed with a rubber core filling a steel shell, which was later identified as a design prone to structural failure.

Flight and disappearance 
Flight 202 was an international scheduled passenger flight from Buenos Aires, Argentina, destination New York City, New York, with three en route stops scheduled at Montevideo, Uruguay; Rio de Janeiro, Brazil; and Port of Spain, Trinidad and Tobago. It began its route on the evening of April 28, 1952, in Buenos Aires, and after stopping off in Montevideo, it arrived in Rio de Janeiro at 1:05 a.m. local time (04:05 UTC) on April 29. It departed Rio less than two hours later, at 2:43 a.m. (05:43 UTC), heading for Port of Spain on the third leg of its journey. It was cleared to fly an off-airways route directly to Port of Spain, which took it over the dense forests of the Amazon jungle that were still unexplored at the time.

The flight reported abeam the city of Barreiras in eastern Brazil at 6:16 a.m. local time (09:16 UTC), flying at  under VFR conditions; the pilots estimated that the next position report would be at 7:45 a.m. (10:45 UTC), abeam the city of Carolina in the northeastern state of Maranhão, Brazil. This was the last known message from the flight. Witnesses in the villages of Formosa and São Francisco reported seeing the aircraft overhead at about the time it reported abeam Barreiras; they described the aircraft as operating normally.

When the aircraft failed to report abeam Carolina and then abeam the city of Santarém in northern Brazil, local authorities initiated a missing aircraft alert.

Search and discovery 
Brazilian Air Force, USAF, and US Navy aircraft searched the jungle, while Brazilian Navy ships searched the coastal areas off northern South America.

"The burned, broken wreckage of the Pan American Stratocruiser that vanished Monday night was found in northern Brazil today." There was no evidence that any of the 50 persons on board, including 19 Americans, lived through the crash.

Airline officials said the find had been made by a C-46 Pan American cargo plane piloted by Capt. Jim Kowing of Miami. The double-decked Stratocruiser was reported to have broken in two; its charred wreckage was scattered on both sides of a  hill.

A Pan American passenger plane was converted to carry a seven-man rescue unit, headed by Maj. Richard Olney of the United States Air Force base at San Juan, Puerto Rico, and Maj. Oliver Seaman, an Air Force flight surgeon.

Pan American's office at Miami reported that, after circling the scene for four hours, the rescue plane returned to its base at Para without dropping the rescue team. It said they did not jump because there were no signs of survivors.

Investigation 
Unfortunately, the extreme nature of the terrain forced all but seven team members to return to Lago Grande before reaching the site. The remaining seven investigators, running short of water, food and other supplies, were only able to confirm that all on board had died on impact and that a huge fire had consumed the fuselage.

A properly equipped and provisioned second investigation team built a base camp northwest of Lago Grande and finally reached the wreckage on August 15. They determined that the wreckage had fallen to the ground in three main sections.

Although the No. 2 engine and its propeller were not found, evidence on the port wing root, the No. 2 engine nacelle, the leading edge of the vertical stabilizer, and the horizontal stabilizer led investigators to believe that the engine and/or propeller had failed in flight.  There had been two prior engine separation incidents with the 377, on January 24 and 25, 1950. In this case, investigators hypothesized that the propeller failure caused the engine to experience highly unbalanced loads and it eventually separated from the aircraft, precipitating an in-flight breakup. Debris from the propeller and engine may have contributed to the breakup by damaging control surfaces after being flung from the port wing during the failure.

See also
1954 Prestwick air disaster
Northwest Orient Airlines Flight 2
Pan Am Flight 6
Pan Am Flight 7
Pan Am Flight 845/26

References
Notes

Sources

External links
 Accident Report on Flight 202 - Civil Aeronautics Board - PDF
 
 

Airliner accidents and incidents caused by in-flight structural failure
Airliner accidents and incidents caused by mechanical failure
Airliner accidents and incidents involving in-flight engine separations
Aviation accidents and incidents in Brazil
Aviation accidents and incidents in 1952
202
1952 in Brazil
Accidents and incidents involving the Boeing 377
April 1952 events in South America
Airliner accidents and incidents caused by engine failure